Asgaran (also Romanized as ‘Asgarān, ‘Asgārān, and ‘Askarān) is a village in Borborud-e Sharqi Rural District, in the Central District of Aligudarz County, Lorestan Province, Iran. At the 2006 census, its population was 31, in 8 families.

References 

Towns and villages in Aligudarz County